Midnight Shadow is a 1939 film with an all African-American cast. It was directed and produced by George Randol, who was also African American.

Plot
The mind-reading Prince Alihabad courts a girl from Oklahoma played by Frances E. Redd. Her parents want to make her happy, but they do not like that Alihabad worships Allah. A killer is on the loose and locals fear that it might be Alihabad.

Cast
 Frances Redd as Margaret Wilson
 Buck Woods as Lightfoot
 Richard Bates as Jr. Lingley
 Clinton Rosemond as Mr. Dan Wilson
 Jesse Lee Brooks as Sergeant Ramsey
 Edward Brandon as Buster Barnett
 Ollie Ann Robinson as Mrs. Emma Wilson
 Laurence Criner (billed as John Criner) as Prince Alihabad
 Pete Webster (actor) as John Mason
 Ruby Dandridge as Mrs. Lingley
 Napoleon Simpson as Mr. Ernest Lingley

Book coverage
The film was briefly discussed in terms of plot and as an African American production in the books Hollywood Be Thy Name: African American Religion in American Film, 1929-1949 and Whispered Consolations: Law and Narrative in African American Life.

References

External links
 Full Cast and Crew: Midnight Shadow (1939), IMdB
 
 
 
 "Ruth Lankford Redd Accompanies the Negro Community Chorus of Columbia, Missouri", undated photograph from Columbia, MO includes John Roland Redd's sisters Ruth Lankford Redd (accompanist) and Frances Elizabeth Redd, Collection: African Americans in Northeast Missouri, Hannibal Free Library

1939 films
1939 mystery films
American mystery films
American black-and-white films
1930s mystery films
Race films
1930s American films
1930s English-language films